Clapham cum Newby is a civil parish in the Craven district of North Yorkshire, England. It was formerly in the Settle Rural District. It contains the villages of Clapham and Newby. According to the 2001 UK census, Clapham cum Newby parish had a population of 659, falling to 640 at the 2011 Census.

History

Listed monuments 
Clapham cum Newby has 47 listed buildings and monuments.

Perhaps the oldest is the base of a standing cross, located outside the Manor House. The base was reportedly constructed during the reign (1199–1216) of King John, who granted Clapham a market charter. At some point over the next seven centuries, the original cross was removed from its base. In 1897, to commemorate the Diamond jubilee of Queen Victoria, a new shaft and cross were installed on top of the original base.

The village church was constructed in the 15th century. The church was rebuilt and altered in the 19th century, leaving only the tower from the original building.

While the Manor House has its origins in a mediaeval building, the present building dates from 1701, while it was still a private residence. Later in the 18th century, a bridge across the river was constructed, to provide access to the local church. It is now a community centre.

Private broadband network
In 2016, the residents of Clapham cum Newby were informed by the UK government that it would be too expensive to extend superfast broadband to the area, due to it being a remote rural area. Residents responded to this by raising £250,000 to fund the installation of a private broadband connection to BT's network, which would serve everyone in the parish.

References

Civil parishes in North Yorkshire